S. cataracta could refer to one of the following species:
Schistura cataracta, a ray-finned fish in the genus Schistura
Scolopendra cataracta, a centipede in the family Scolopendridae